γ-L-Glutamyl-butirosin B γ-glutamyl cyclotransferase (EC 4.3.2.6, btrG (gene)) is an enzyme with systematic name γ-L-glutamyl-butirosin B γ-glutamyl cyclotransferase (5-oxo-L-proline producing). This enzyme catalyses the following chemical reaction

 γ-L-glutamyl-butirosin B  butirosin B + 5-oxo-L-proline

The enzyme catalyses the last step in the biosynthesis of the aminoglycoside antibiotic butirosin B.

References

External links 
 

EC 4.3.2